Arthur Massé (30 October 1894 – 25 October 1972) was a Canadian forest engineer, land surveyor and professor and politician. Masse served as an Independent Liberal member of the House of Commons of Canada. He was born in Kamouraska, Quebec.

Massé was educated at Ste-Anne-de-la-Pocatière College. He then graduated from Université Laval with a Bachelor of Arts degree, where he would later serve as a professor.

He was first elected to Parliament at the Kamouraska riding in the 1949 general election then re-elected for a second term in 1953. Massé became a Liberal party candidate in the 1957 election but was defeated by independent candidate Benoît Chabot.

References

External links
 

1894 births
1972 deaths
Members of the House of Commons of Canada from Quebec
Independent Liberal MPs in Canada
Université Laval alumni
Academic staff of Université Laval